Asian Highway 64 (AH64) is a road in the Asian Highway Network running 1666 km (1041 miles) from Petropavl, Kazakhstan to Barnaul, Russia connecting AH6 and AH62 to AH4. The route is as follows:

Kazakhstan
: Petropavl - Kokshetau
 A1 Highway: Kokshetau - Nur-Sultan
: Nur-Sultan - Shiderty
: Shiderty - Pavlodar
: Pavlodar - Semey
: Semey - Rubtsovsk

Russia
: border with Kazakhstan - Rubtsovsk - Barnaul

Asian Highway Network
Roads in Kazakhstan
Roads in Russia